Zelda Nolte (1929–2003) was a South African- British sculptor and woodblock printmaker.

Education 
Zelda Nolte studied at the Kunstgewerbeschule Zürich under the directorship of Johannes Itten, which became Zürcher Hochschule der Künste, and sculpture, at Michaelis School of Fine Art, University of Cape Town under Professor Lippy Lipshitz.

Exhibitions and collections 

Nolte represented South Africa in the 1963 Sao Paulo Bienale. She has work in the collection of the Iziko South African National Gallery, Cape Town   and the New Hall Art Collection, University of Cambridge.

Selected Exhibitions to 1978 from Zelda Nolte Exhibition catalogue 1978, Hobson Gallery, Cambridge, UK.
(archive):

1960 South African Quadrennial Exhibition, National Gallery Cape Town, South Africa

1962 National Art Gallery, Port Elizabeth, South African

1963 Solo Exhibition, Association of Arts Gallery, Cape Town, South Africa

1963 Sao Paolo Biennale, Brazil

1964 Johannesburg Festival Exhibition, Milner Park, Johannesburg, South Africa

1963 New Orleans International Exhibition, USA

1964 South African Art Today, National Gallery, Cape Town, South Africa

1964 "Group Six", Wolpe Gallery, Cape Town, South Africa

1965 Lidchi Gallery, Johannesburg, South Africa

1965 National Gallery, Salisbury (Harare), Zimbabwe

1968 Group Exhibition, AIA Gallery, London, UK

1971 Solo Exhibition, Artist House Gallery, Jerusalem.

1972 Florence Biennale International Exhibition of Graphic Art, Florence, Italy

1973 Group Exhibition, Binyanei Ha'Ouma, Jerusalem

1974 National Art Gallery Cape Town, "50 Years Michaelis", Cape Town, South Africa

1977 Kettles Yard, Cambridge, Cambridge Society of Painters and Sculptors Group Exhibition, Cambridge, UK

Work

References 

1929 births
2003 deaths
20th-century British women artists
20th-century South African women artists
British sculptors
South African sculptors
British women sculptors
South African women sculptors
University of Cape Town alumni
Michaelis School of Fine Art alumni